On March 27, 1980, a series of volcanic explosions and pyroclastic flows began at Mount St. Helens in Skamania County, Washington, United States. A series of phreatic blasts occurred from the summit and escalated until a major explosive eruption took place on May 18, 1980, at 8:32 AM. The eruption, which had a Volcanic Explosivity Index of 5, was the most significant to occur in the contiguous United States since the much smaller 1915 eruption of Lassen Peak in California. It has often been declared the most disastrous volcanic eruption in U.S. history.

The eruption was preceded by a two-month series of earthquakes and steam-venting episodes caused by an injection of magma at shallow depth below the volcano that created a large bulge and a fracture system on the mountain's north slope. An earthquake at 8:32:11 am PDT (UTC−7) on Sunday, May 18, 1980, caused the entire weakened north face to slide away, a sector collapse which was the largest subaerial landslide in recorded history. This allowed the partly molten rock, rich in high-pressure gas and steam, to suddenly explode northward toward Spirit Lake in a hot mix of lava and pulverized older rock, overtaking the landslide. An eruption column rose  into the atmosphere and deposited ash in 11 U.S. states and various Canadian provinces. Less severe outbursts continued into the next day, only to be followed by other large, but not as destructive, eruptions later that year. Thermal energy released during the eruption was equal to 26 megatons of TNT.

About 57 people were killed, including innkeeper and World War I veteran Harry R. Truman, photographers Reid Blackburn and Robert Landsburg, and geologist David A. Johnston. Hundreds of square miles were reduced to wasteland, causing over $1 billion in damage (equivalent to $ billion in ), thousands of animals were killed, and Mount St. Helens was left with a crater on its north side. At the time of the eruption, the summit of the volcano was owned by the Burlington Northern Railroad, but afterward, the railroad donated the land to the United States Forest Service.  The area was later preserved in the Mount St. Helens National Volcanic Monument.

Build-up to the eruption 
Mount St. Helens remained dormant from its last period of activity in the 1840s and 1850s until March 1980. Several small earthquakes, beginning on March 15, indicated that magma might have begun moving below the volcano. On March 20, at 3:45 pm Pacific Standard Time (all times are in PST or PDT), a shallow, magnitude-4.2 earthquake centered below the volcano's north flank, signaled the volcano's return from 123 years of hibernation. A gradually building earthquake swarm saturated area seismographs and started to climax at about noon on March 25, reaching peak levels in the next two days, including an earthquake registering 5.1 on the Richter scale. A total of 174 shocks of magnitude 2.6 or greater was recorded during those two days.

Shocks of magnitude 3.2 or greater occurred at a slightly increasing rate during April and May, with five earthquakes of magnitude 4 or above per day in early April, and eight per day the week before May 18. Initially,  no direct sign of eruption was seen, but small earthquake-induced avalanches of snow and ice were reported from aerial observations.

At 12:36 pm on March 27, phreatic eruptions (explosions of steam caused by magma suddenly heating groundwater) ejected and smashed rock from within the old summit crater, excavating a new crater   and sending an ash column about  into the air. By this date, a  eastward-trending fracture system had also developed across the summit area.

A second, new crater and a blue flame were observed on March 29. The flame was visibly emitted from both craters and was probably created by burning gases. Ninety-three separate outbursts were reported on March 30, and increasingly strong harmonic tremors were first detected on April 1, alarming geologists and prompting Governor Dixy Lee Ray to declare a state of emergency on April 3. Governor Ray issued an executive order on April 30 creating a "red zone" around the volcano; anyone caught in this zone without a pass faced a $500 fine (equivalent to $ today) or six months in jail. This precluded many cabin owners from visiting their property.

A USGS team determined in the last week of April that a  section of St. Helens' north face was displaced outward by at least . As the bulge moved northward, the summit area behind it progressively sank, forming a complex, down-dropped block called a graben. Geologists announced on April 30 that sliding of the bulge area was the greatest immediate danger and that such a landslide might spark an eruption. This volume increase presumably corresponded to the volume of magma that pushed into the volcano and deformed its surface. Because the intruding magma remained below ground and was not directly visible, it was called a cryptodome, in contrast to a true lava dome exposed at the surface.

On May 7, eruptions similar to those in March and April resumed, and over the following days, the bulge approached its maximum size. All activity had been confined to the 350-year-old summit dome and did not involve any new magma. About 10,000 earthquakes were recorded before the May 18 event, with most concentrated in a small zone less than  directly below the bulge. Visible eruptions ceased on May 16, reducing public interest and consequently the number of spectators in the area. Mounting public pressure then forced officials to allow 50 carloads of property owners to enter the danger zone on Saturday, May 17, to gather whatever property they could carry. Another trip was scheduled for 10 am the next day, and because that was Sunday, more than 300 loggers who would normally be working in the area were not there.

Landslide and climactic phase 

As May 18 dawned, Mount St. Helens' activity did not show any change from the pattern of the preceding month. The rates of bulge movement and sulfur dioxide emission, and ground temperature readings did not reveal any changes indicating a catastrophic eruption.

At 8:32 am, a magnitude-5.1 earthquake centered directly below the north slope triggered that part of the volcano to slide, approximately 7–20 seconds after the shock,  followed a few seconds later by the main volcanic blast.

Rosenquist, his party, and his photographs survived because the blast was deflected by local topography  short of his location.

This, in turn, created a  avalanche of debris consisting of the returning waters and thousands of uprooted trees and stumps. Some of these remained intact with roots, but most had been sheared off at the stump seconds earlier by the blast of superheated volcanic gas and ash that had immediately followed and overtaken the initial landslide.

Four decades after the eruption, floating log mats persist on Spirit Lake and nearby St. Helens Lake, changing position with the wind. The rest of the trees, especially those that were not completely detached from their roots, were turned upright by their own weight and became waterlogged, sinking into the muddy sediments at the bottom where they are in the process of becoming petrified in the anaerobic and mineral-rich waters. This provides insight into other sites with a similar fossil record.

Pyroclastic flows

Initial lateral blast 

The landslide exposed the dacite magma in St. Helens' neck to much lower pressure, causing the gas-charged, partially molten rock and high-pressure steam above it to explode a few seconds after the landslide started. Explosions burst through the trailing part of the landslide, blasting rock debris northward. The resulting blast directed the pyroclastic flow laterally. It consisted of very hot volcanic gases, ash, and pumice formed from new lava, as well as pulverized old rock, which hugged the ground.

Pyroclastic flow material passed over the moving avalanche and spread outward, devastating a fan-shaped area 23 miles across by 19 miles long (37 km × 31 km). At its vent, the lateral blast probably did not last longer than about 30 seconds, but the northward-radiating and expanding blast cloud continued for about another minute.

Superheated flow material flashed water in Spirit Lake and North Fork Toutle River to steam, creating a larger, secondary explosion that was heard as far away as British Columbia, Montana, Idaho, and Northern California, yet many areas closer to the eruption (Portland, Oregon, for example) did not hear the blast. This so-called "quiet zone" extended radially a few tens of miles from the volcano and was created by the complex response of the eruption's sound waves to differences in temperature and air motion of the atmospheric layers, and to a lesser extent, local topography.

Lateral blast result 

The huge ensuing ash cloud sent skyward from St. Helens' northern foot was visible throughout the quiet zone. The area affected by the blast can be subdivided into roughly concentric zones:
For this reason, this zone also has been called the "tree-removal zone". The flow of the material carried by the blast was not deflected by topographic features in this zone.
In this zone, the forces and direction of the blast are strikingly demonstrated by the parallel alignment of toppled large trees, broken off at the base of the trunk as if they were blades of grass mown by a scythe. This zone was also known as the "tree-down zone". Channeling and deflection of the blast caused strikingly varied local effects that still remained conspicuous after some decades. Where the blast struck open land directly, it scoured it, breaking trees off short and stripping vegetation and even topsoil, thereby delaying revegetation for many years. Where the blast was deflected so as to pass overhead by several metres, it left the topsoil and the seeds it contained, permitting faster revegetation with scrub and herbaceous plants, and later with saplings. Trees in the path of such higher-level blasts were broken off wholesale at various heights, whereas nearby stands in more sheltered positions recovered comparatively rapidly without conspicuous long-term harm. 
 Seared zone, also called the "standing dead" zone, the outermost fringe of the impacted area, is a zone in which trees remained standing, but were singed brown by the hot gases of the blast.

Most of the 57 people known to have died in that day's eruption succumbed to asphyxiation, while several died from burns. Lodge owner Harry R. Truman was buried under hundreds of feet of avalanche material. Volcanologist David A. Johnston who was stationed at Observation post Coldwater II located just 6 miles (10 km) north of the mountain, was one of those killed, as was Reid Blackburn, a National Geographic photographer who was situated near Coldwater Creek,  from the volcano, on the day of the eruption. Robert Landsburg, another photographer, who was within a few miles of the summit, was killed by the ash cloud. He was able to protect his film with his body, and the surviving photos provided geologists with valuable documentation of the historic eruption. Another eruption victim, amateur radio operator Gerry Martin, located near the Coldwater peak and farther north of Johnston's position, reporting his sighting of the eruption enveloping the Coldwater II observation post. As the blast overwhelmed Johnston's post, Martin declared solemnly: "Gentlemen, the camper and car that’s sitting over to the south of me is covered. It’s going to hit me, too." before his radio went silent.

Later flows 
Subsequent outpourings of pyroclastic material from the breach left by the landslide consisted mainly of new magmatic debris rather than fragments of pre-existing volcanic rocks. The resulting deposits formed a fan-like pattern of overlapping sheets, tongues, and lobes.

The flow deposits were still at about  two weeks after they erupted. Secondary steam-blast eruptions fed by this heat created pits on the northern margin of the pyroclastic-flow deposits, at the south shore of Spirit Lake, and along the upper part of the North Fork Toutle River. These steam-blast explosions continued sporadically for weeks or months after the emplacement of pyroclastic flows, and at least one occurred a year later, on May 16, 1981.

Ash column 

Near the volcano, the swirling ash particles in the atmosphere generated lightning, which in turn started many forest fires. During this time, parts of the mushroom-shaped ash-cloud column collapsed, and fell back upon the earth. This fallout, mixed with magma, mud, and steam, sent additional pyroclastic flows speeding down St. Helens' flanks. Later, slower flows came directly from the new north-facing crater and consisted of glowing pumice bombs and very hot pumiceous ash.

Continuing eastward, St. Helens' ash fell in the western part of Yellowstone National Park by 10:15 pm, and was seen on the ground in Denver the next day. In time, ash fall from this eruption was reported as far away as Minnesota and Oklahoma, and some of the ash drifted around the globe within about 2 weeks.

By around 5:30 pm on May 18, the vertical ash column declined in stature, but less severe outbursts continued through the next several days.

Ash properties

Generally, given that the way airborne ash is deposited after an eruption is strongly influenced by the meteorological conditions, a certain variation of the ash type will occur, as a function of distance to the volcano or time elapsed from eruption. The ash from Mount St. Helens is no exception, hence the ash properties have large variations.

Chemical composition
The bulk chemical composition of the ash has been found to be about 65% silicon dioxide, 18% aluminum oxide, 5% ferric oxide, 4% each calcium oxide and sodium oxide, and 2% magnesium oxide. Trace elements were also detected, their concentrations varying as 0.05–0.09% chlorine, 0.02–0.03% fluorine, and 0.09–0.3% sulfur.

Index of refraction 
The index of refraction, a measure used in physics to describe how light propagates through a particular substance, is an important property of volcanic ash. This number is complex, having both real and imaginary parts, the real part indicating how light disperses and the imaginary part indicating how light is absorbed by the substance.

The silicate particles are known to have a real index of refraction ranging between 1.5 and 1.6 for visible light. However, a spectrum of colors is associated with samples of volcanic ash, from very light to dark gray. This makes for variations in the measured imaginary refractive index under visible light.

In the case of Mount St. Helens, the ash settled in three main layers on the ground: 
 The bottom layer was dark gray and was found to be abundant in older rocks and crystal fragments.
 The middle layer consisted of a mixture of glass shards and pumice.
 The top layer was ash consisting of very fine particles.

Here, the  sample (k was found to be around 0.009) was much more absorbent than the  sample (k was found to be around 0.002).

Mudslides flow downstream 

The hot, exploding material also broke apart and melted nearly all of the mountain's glaciers, along with most of the overlying snow. As in many previous St. Helens' eruptions, this created huge lahars (volcanic mudflows) and muddy floods that affected three of the four stream drainage systems on the mountain, and which started to move as early as 8:50 am. Mudflows from the southern and eastern flanks had the consistency of wet concrete as they raced down Muddy River, Pine Creek, and Smith Creek to their confluence at the Lewis River.

Glacier and snowmelt mixed with tephra on the volcano's northeast slope to create much larger lahars. These mudflows traveled down the north and south forks of the Toutle River and joined at the confluence of the Toutle forks and the Cowlitz River near Castle Rock, Washington, at 1:00 pm.

A large but slower-moving mudflow with a mortar-like consistency was mobilized in early afternoon at the head of the Toutle River north fork. By 2:30 pm, the massive mudflow had destroyed Camp Baker, and in the following hours, seven bridges were carried away. Part of the flow backed up for  soon after entering the Cowlitz River, but most continued downstream. The resulting  river depth temporarily closed the busy channel to ocean-going freighters, costing Portland, Oregon, an estimated $5 million (equivalent to $ million today).

Aftermath

Direct results 
The May 18, 1980, event was the most deadly and economically destructive volcanic eruption in the history of the contiguous United States. U.S. President Jimmy Carter surveyed the damage, and said it looked more desolate than a moonscape.

A film crew was dropped by helicopter on Mount St. Helens on May 23 to document the destruction, but their compasses spun in circles and they quickly became lost. A second eruption occurred the next day (see below), but the crew survived and was rescued two days after that. A quarter of that volume was fresh lava in the form of ash, pumice, and volcanic bombs, while the rest was fragmented, older rock.

At least 25% of the destroyed timber was salvaged after September 1980. Downwind of the volcano, in areas of thick ash accumulation, many agricultural crops, such as wheat, apples, potatoes, and alfalfa, were destroyed. As many as 1,500 elk and 5,000 deer were killed, and an estimated 12 million Chinook and Coho salmon fingerlings died when their hatcheries were destroyed. Another estimated 40,000 young salmon were lost when they swam through turbine blades of hydroelectric generators after reservoir levels were lowered along the Lewis River to accommodate possible mudflows and flood waters.

In total, Mount St. Helens released 24 megatons of thermal energy, seven of which were a direct result of the blast. This is equivalent to 1,600 times the size of the atomic bomb dropped on Hiroshima.

Disputed death toll
The death toll most commonly cited is 57, but two points of dispute remain.

The first point regards two officially listed victims, Paul Hiatt and Dale Thayer. They were reported missing after the explosion. In the aftermath, investigators were able to locate individuals named Paul Hiatt and Dale Thayer who were alive and well. However, they were unable to determine who reported Hiatt missing, and the person who was listed as reporting Thayer missing claimed she was not the one who had done so. Since the investigators could not thus verify that they were the same Hiatt and Thayer who were reported missing, the names remain listed among the presumed dead.

The second point regards three missing people who are not officially listed as victims: Robert Ruffle, Steven Whitsett, and Mark Melanson. Cowlitz County Emergency Services Management lists them as "Possibly Missing — Not on [the official] List". According to Melanson's brother, in October 1983, Cowlitz County officials told his family that Melanson "is believed [...] a victim of the May 18, 1980, eruption" and that after years of searching, the family eventually decided "he's buried in the ash".

Taking these two points of dispute into consideration, the direct death toll could be as low as 55 or as high as 60. When combined with the four indirect victims (two dying from vehicle accidents due to poor visibility, and two dying from heart attacks triggered by shovelling ash) those numbers range from 59 to 64.

Ash damage and removal 

The ash fall created some temporary major problems with transportation, sewage disposal, and water treatment systems. Visibility was greatly decreased during the ash fall, closing many highways and roads. Interstate 90 from Seattle to Spokane was closed for a week and a half. Air travel was disrupted for between a few days and two weeks, as several airports in eastern Washington shut down because of ash accumulation and poor visibility. Over a thousand commercial flights were cancelled following airport closures. Fine-grained, gritty ash caused substantial problems for internal combustion engines and other mechanical and electrical equipment. The ash contaminated oil systems, clogged air filters, and scratched moving surfaces. Fine ash caused short circuits in electrical transformers, which in turn caused power blackouts.

Removing and disposing of the ash was a monumental task for some Eastern Washington communities. The ash removal cost $2.2 million and took 10 weeks in Yakima. The need to remove ash quickly from transport routes and civil works dictated the selection of some disposal sites. Some cities used old quarries and existing sanitary landfills; others created dump sites wherever expedient. To minimize wind reworking of ash dumps, the surfaces of some disposal sites were covered with topsoil and seeded with grass. In Portland, the mayor eventually threatened businesses with fines if they failed to remove the ash from their parking lots.

Cost 

 
A refined estimate of $1.1 billion ($3.4 billion ) was determined in a study by the International Trade Commission at the request of the United States Congress. A supplemental appropriation of $951 million for disaster relief was voted by Congress, of which the largest share went to the Small Business Administration, U.S. Army Corps of Engineers, and the Federal Emergency Management Agency.

Also, indirect and intangible costs of the eruption were incurred. Unemployment in the immediate region of Mount St. Helens rose 10-fold in the weeks immediately following the eruption, and then returned to near-normal levels once timber-salvaging and ash-cleanup operations were underway. Only a small percentage of residents left the region because of lost jobs owing to the eruption. Several months after May 18, a few residents reported suffering stress and emotional problems, though they had coped successfully during the crisis. Counties in the region requested funding for mental-health programs to assist such people.

Initial public reaction to the May 18 eruption dealt a nearly crippling blow to tourism, an important industry in Washington. Not only was tourism down in the Mount St. Helens–Gifford Pinchot National Forest area, but conventions, meetings and social gatherings also were cancelled or postponed at cities and resorts elsewhere in Washington and neighboring Oregon not affected by the eruption. The adverse effect on tourism and conventioneering, however, proved only temporary. Mount St. Helens, perhaps because of its reawakening, has regained its appeal for tourists. The U.S. Forest Service and the State of Washington opened visitor centers and provided access for people to view the volcano's devastation.

Later eruptions 

St. Helens produced an additional five explosive eruptions between May and October 1980. Through early 1990, at least 21 periods of eruptive activity had occurred. The volcano remains active, with smaller, dome-building eruptions continuing into 2008.

1980–1991
An eruption occurred on May 25, 1980, at 2:30 am that sent an ash column  into the atmosphere. The eruption was preceded by a sudden increase in earthquake activity, and occurred during a rainstorm. Erratic wind from the storm carried ash from the eruption to the south and west, lightly dusting large parts of western Washington and Oregon. Pyroclastic flows exited the northern breach and covered avalanche debris, lahars, and other pyroclastic flows deposited by the May 18 eruption.

At 9:09 pm, a much stronger explosion sent an ash column about  skyward. This event caused the Portland area, previously spared by wind direction, to be thinly coated with ash in the middle of the annual Rose Festival.

A series of large explosions on July 22 broke more than a month of relative quiet. The July eruptive episode was preceded by several days of measurable expansion of the summit area, heightened earthquake activity, and changed emission rates of sulfur dioxide and carbon dioxide. The first hit at 5:14 pm as an ash column shot  and was followed by a faster blast at 6:25 pm that pushed the ash column above its previous maximum height in just 7.5 minutes. The final explosion started at 7:01 pm, and continued over two hours. When the relatively small amount of ash settled over eastern Washington, the dome built in June was gone.

Seismic activity and gas emission steadily increased in early August, and on August 7 at 4:26 pm, an ash cloud slowly expanded  into the sky. Small pyroclastic flows came through the northern breach and a weaker outpouring of ash rose from the crater. This continued until 10:32 pm, when a second large blast sent ash high into the air, proceeding due north. A second dacite dome filled this vent a few days later.

Two months of repose were ended by an eruption lasting from October 16 to 18. This event obliterated the second dome, sent ash 10 mi in the air and created small, red-hot pyroclastic flows. In spite of the dome growth next to it, a new glacier formed rapidly inside the crater.

All of the post-1980 eruptions were quiet dome-building events, beginning with the December 27, 1980, to January 3, 1981, episode.

Further eruptions occurred over a few months between 1989 and 1991.

2004–2008

The 2004–2008 volcanic activity of Mount St. Helens has been documented as a continuous eruption with a gradual extrusion of magma at the Mount St. Helens volcano. Starting in October 2004, a gradual building of a new lava dome happened. The new dome did not rise above the crater created by the 1980 eruption. This activity lasted until January 2008.

Summary table

See also

 Cascade Volcanoes – High Cascades
 The Eruption of Mount St. Helens! (1980 film) – documentary movie about the eruption
 St. Helens (1981 film) - television movie about the eruption
 Geology of the Pacific Northwest
 Helenite – An artificial glass marketed as a gemstone, made by fusing the volcanic dust from Mount St. Helens' May 1980 eruption
 List of Cascade volcanoes
 List of volcanoes in the United States
 Pacific Ring of Fire

References

Citations

Sources 

 
 
 
 
  (adapted public domain text)

Further reading

External links 

  
 List of victims with biographical details
 USGS: Mount St. Helens 1980 Debris Avalanche Deposit
 USDA Forest Service: Mount St. Helens VolcanoCam
  Pre-1980 Eruptive History of Mount St. Helens, Washington
 USGS: Before, During, and After May 18, 1980
 
 Boston.com – The Big Picture – 30 years later
 
 
 Aerial pictures of the July 22nd, 1980 secondary eruption
 News reports  at The Museum of Classic Chicago Television

Mount St. Helens 1980
Mount St. Helens 1980
Mount St. Helens 1980
Mount St. Helens
Mount St. Helens
1980 Mount St. Helens
Cascade Volcanoes
Gifford Pinchot National Forest
Mount St. Helens
Mount St. Helens 1980
Volcanism of Washington (state)
eruption of Mount St. Helens
May 1980 events in the United States
Megatsunamis
St. Helens
Volcanic eruptions in the United States
Phreatic eruptions
Plinian eruptions
Peléan eruptions
Volcanic tsunamis